Valladolid Rugby Asociación Club is a Spanish rugby union club. The club was established in 1986 and currently competes in the División de Honor de Rugby competition, the highest level of Spanish club rugby. The club are based in Valladolid in central Spain. VRAC play in blue and white colours. The team have in the past won both the Spanish League and the Copa del Rey de Rugby. They play at Estadio Pepe Rojo.

Honours
División de Honor: 10
 Champions: 1998–99, 2000–01, 2011–12, 2012–13, 2013–14, 2014–15, 2016–17, 2017–18, 2018–19, 2019–20
Copa del Rey: 5
 Champions: 1997–98, 2009–10, 2013–14, 2014–15, 2017–18
 Runners-up: 2012–13
Supercopa de España: 7
 Champions: 2010, 2012, 2013, 2014, 2015, 2016, 2017
Copa Ibérica de Rugby: 3
 Champions: 2014, 2017, 2018

European rugby
Valladolid RAC's first foray into Europe was in the 2001–02 European Challenge Cup.  Playing in a pool with London Irish (England), Dax (France) and L'Aquila (Italy), they lost all six games.

The 2003–04 season saw a change in format in the European Challenge Cup.  Teams played in a knockout format, over two legs, in each round.  First round losing teams then played in a new, third tier, Shield competition.  Having lost heavily home and away to England's Newcastle Falcons in Round 1 of the 2003–04 European Challenge Cup, they dropped into the European Shield.  Here their performance against Italy's Overmach Parma was better, but nevertheless they again lost home and away.

The 2004–05 season was a close repeat of 2003–04: heavy losses home and away to Italy's Viadana in the Challenge Cup was followed by even heavier defeats at the hands of England's Leeds in the Shield.

As the winners of the 2011–12 División de Honor de Rugby and the championship playoff, Valladolid RAC qualified to play in the 2012–13 European Challenge Cup but turned down the opportunity due to economic factors. Gernika RT took their place and represented Spain.

As the winners of the 2013–14 División de Honor championship, VRAC qualified to play the Iberian Rugby Cup against CDUL of Lisbon, winning the game and the title.

In 2015/16 season, Valladolid RAC as the champion of the 2014/15 División de Honor championship, represented Spain at the Qualifying Competition of the European Rugby Challenge Cup. In this competition VRAC won two games, against Royal Kituro Rugby Club (Belgium) and Mogliano Rugby (Italy) but lost against Grupo Desportivo Direito (Portugal) and Timișoara Saracens (Romania).

Summary

Squad 2012–13

International honours
  Víctor Acevedo
  Fernando de la Calle
  Aníbal Fernando Bonan
  Benjamín Pardo (Rugby)
  Nacho Müller
  Glen Rolls
  Gareth Griffiths

Other notable players 
  Sgt. Adam Newton (English Armed Services XV, England U18)
  Gareth Griffiths (former player from Bath, international England U18, U19)
  Mike Davis (International New Zealand Sevens)
  Glen Lewis Rolls (New Zealand U17, Hurricanes Schools, Canterbury B)
  Lisandro Arbizu (Player/Coach 2012-2014, Argentina international 1990-2005 Cpt 1992-1999)

Season to season

25 seasons in División de Honor

See also
 Rugby union in Spain

References

External links
 VRAC Official website
 Spanish Rugby website

Spanish rugby union teams
Sport in Valladolid
Sports teams in Castile and León
Rugby clubs established in 1986